The Vân đài loại ngữ is a 1773 Chinese-language encyclopedia compiled by the Vietnamese scholar Lê Quý Đôn. Its title is variously translated into English as Categorized Sayings from the Van Terrace or Classified discourse from the library. The work was heavily influenced by Song Dynasty Confucianism.

References

1773 books
Vietnamese encyclopedias
Chinese-language literature of Vietnam
18th-century encyclopedias
Leishu
Lê dynasty texts